Sex with a Smile II (originally titled Spogliamoci così, senza pudor) is a 1976 commedia sexy all'italiana film directed by Sergio Martino. Like its predecessor, Sex with a Smile, it is an anthology sex comedy film with a series of four comedic sketches that parody Italian sexual mores.

Cast 
Ursula Andress: Marina  
Johnny Dorelli: Marco Antonioli  
Aldo Maccione: the detective 
Barbara Bouchet: Violante 
Enrico Montesano: Dante Zatteroni  
Alberto Lionello: Giangi Busacca 
Nadia Cassini: Françoise   
Ninetto Davoli: Pietro  
Maria Baxa: Maria  
Alvaro Vitali: Broccolini 
Gianrico Tedeschi: Silvestri  
Brenda Welch: soccer player   
Daniele Vargas: Lawyer Sante Zenaro

See also 

 List of Italian films of 1976

References

External links

1976 films
Commedia sexy all'italiana
Films directed by Sergio Martino
Italian anthology films
1970s sex comedy films
1976 comedy films
1970s Italian films